More News for Lulu is the second album of hard bop compositions performed by John Zorn, George Lewis, and Bill Frisell. Like the previous News for Lulu it features tunes by Kenny Dorham, Hank Mobley, Freddie Redd and Sonny Clark but also contains with one tune each by Misha Mengelberg and Big John Patton. The album was recorded live in Paris and Basel. It was released in 1992 on the Swiss Hathut Record label.

Reception

The Allmusic review by Scott Yanow awarded the album 4½ stars stating "The music swings in its own fashion and, although it tugs at the boundaries of the bop tradition, it mostly stays within its borders. Bill Frisell, operating as the entire rhythm section, is a wonder as usual. Recommended". Guy Peters stated "More News for Lulu still isn’t your average bop tribute, because the horns honk and squeal a bit too often to be considered as truly faithful to hard bop, and Frisell’s guitar antics are probably not something a snobbish jazz buff will dig, but that was never the intention anyway. Amidst the edgy improvisation are also instances to be found of interestingly updated jazz that’s quite accessible, performed by a trio that succeeds in combining their personal style and the basic ingredients from the past".

Track listing 
 "Blue Minor I" (Clark) - 6:04
 "Hank's Other Tune" (Mobley) - 6:21
 "News for Lulu" (Clark) - 5:26
 "Gare Guillemins" (Mengelberg) - 3:47
 "Minor Swing" (Patton) - 5:40
 "KD's Motion/Windmill" (Dorham) - 5:02
 "Funk in Deep Freeze" (Mobley) - 4:36
 "Eastern Incident" (Clark) - 5:58
 "Lotus Blossom" (Dorham) - 4:15
 "Melanie" (Redd) - 6:40
 "Ole" (Redd) - 5:01
 "Blue Minor II" (Clark) - 5:04
 "Peckin' Time" (Mobley) - 3:29
 "Blues, Blues, Blues" (Redd) - 4:42
 "Melody for C" (Clark) - 5:46
 Tracks 1-7 recorded live by Radio France at the Maison de la Radio, Paris on January 19, 1989. Tracks 8-15 recorded live by Peter Pfister at Stadttheater Basel, Switzerland on January 18, 1989

Personnel 
 John Zorn - alto saxophone
 George Lewis - trombone
 Bill Frisell - guitar

References 

Albums produced by John Zorn
Bill Frisell live albums
John Zorn live albums
George E. Lewis live albums
1992 live albums
Hathut Records live albums